Yadanar Khin is a Burmese film actress and model, most popular in the 2000s. 

She attended the Practising School Yangon Institute of Education. She married her husband, Soe Hlaing U, in 2005, with whom she has three sons, Zwe Oo Htet, Htun Myat Oo, and Kaung Hset Oo. She is currently a restaurateur, with several Burmese-style restaurants in Yangon.

Filmography

Films

References

Living people
1980 births
Burmese film actresses
People from Yangon
21st-century Burmese actresses